The 1998 NC State Wolfpack football team represented North Carolina State University during the 1998 NCAA Division I-A football season with Mike O'Cain as its head coach.  NC State has been a member of the Atlantic Coast Conference (ACC) since the league's inception in 1953.  The Wolfpack played its home games in 1998 at Carter–Finley Stadium in Raleigh, North Carolina, which has been NC State football's home stadium since 1966.

Schedule

References

NC State
NC State Wolfpack football seasons
NC State Wolfpack football